Five-pin billiards or simply five-pins or 5-pins, is today usually a carom billiards form of cue sport, though sometimes still played on a pocket table. In addition to the customary three balls of most carom games, it makes use of a set of five upright pins (skittles) arranged in a "+" pattern at the center of the table. The game is popular especially in Italy (where it originated) and Argentina, but also in some other parts of Latin America and Europe, with international, televised professional tournaments (for the carom version only). A variant of the game,  or nine-pins, adds additional skittles to the formation. A related pocket game, with larger pins, is played in Scandinavia and is referred to in English as Danish pin billiards, with a Swedish variant that has some rules more similar to the Italian game.

History
Until the late 1980s, the game (with some rules differences) was a form of pocket billiards, known in English as Italian skittle pool, and was principally played in pubs, with an object ball that was smaller than the two cue balls.  Professional and regulated amateur play today exclusively uses pocketless tables and equal-sized balls. Professional competition began in 1965, and play is centered in billiard parlors, with players competing in provincial, regional, and national federations.  The pocket version is still favored by some in amateur play.

Equipment and setup

The slate  of the table must be heated to about 5 degrees C (9 degrees F) above room temperature, which helps to keep moisture out of the cloth to aid the balls rolling and rebounding in a consistent manner, and generally makes the table play "faster". In informal play, an unheated table is often used.

There are traditionally four white pins, and one red. The whites are spaced just far enough away from the red that a cue ball can pass between the pins without touching any of them. The final pattern looks like a plus sign. This arrangement of pins on the table is referred to as the "castle". Tables have the precise castle positions for the pins, and for the starting positions of the balls, permanently marked, as they must be placed back into position before every shot if any have been knocked over or moved.

Each player uses a cue stick to shoot the appropriate cue ball; average cue length is 140 cm (about 55 in.) A  may be used to reach long shots.

Rules
Though there are variants in Central and South America, the Italian five-pins rules are the best codified. Because the Italian-rules championships organized by the Italian Federation of Billiard Sport (FIBiS) are international, televised events, and often hosted outside of Italy, the FIBiS rules are the global de facto standard, and have been incorporated into the rules promulgated by the Union Mondiale de Billard.

Object
The goal of the game is to earn a required number of points, before one's opponent does, by using one's cue ball to cause the opponent's cue ball to knock over pins (and to not do so with one's own cue ball), and by contacting the red object ball with either cue ball, after one's own cue ball has contacted that of the opponent, and/or by causing the object ball to knock over pins, again after one's own cue ball has contacted that of the opponent.

Play
The game is played by two players or by two teams (a pair of doubles partners most commonly, but also larger teams). Determining who goes first can be done by any means ( usually, but also coin toss, tournament stipulations about player order, etc.). Each player or team is assigned one of the two cue balls; this is the only cue ball they may hit with the cue stick. The first player or team always uses the (plain) white cue ball, the opponent the other ball. Unlike in many games, shots are always taken in rotation – the same player or team never shoots twice in a row even if they have scored (other than if the opponent fouled before actually shooting when their turn came up, such as by moving one of the balls accidentally). Play continues until one player or team wins by being the first to achieve or exceed a specific number of points (usually 50 or 60), either agreed upon beforehand by the players, or set by tournament organizers.  In informal play, the number is often lower, such as 25.

Unlike in the major carom game three-cushion billiards, there is no requirement to hit one or more cushions at any time.

Scoring
Knocking over pins, by any of the acceptable prescribed manners, earns cumulative points as follows:
Each white pin is worth two points.
The red pin is worth four points, if white pins were also knocked over.
The red pin is worth 10 points, if it is the only pin knocked down (by the ball going between the set of pins and narrowly missing all of the whites). Until 2013, this feat was worth eight points.
Knocking over pins with the object ball without hitting the opponent's cue ball first, or with one's own cue ball, does not earn the shooter any points, and in the latter case is a foul that awards points to the opponent.
The acceptable means of knocking over pins include any that result from hitting the opponent's object ball first with one's own, and not hitting the pins with one's own cue ball. For example, one can simply send the opponent's cue ball into the pins, send the opponent's cue ball into the red object ball and have the object ball hit the pins, or hit the opponent's cue ball and then the object ball with one's own cue ball and send the object ball into the pins.

The object ball itself is also worth points:
If struck by the opponent's cue ball (after the shooter strikes the opponent's cue ball with his/her own), it is worth 3 points (this is known as a casin or in broader terminology a combination shot).
If struck by the shooter's cue ball (after the shooter strikes the opponent's cue ball with his/her own), it is worth 4 points (this is considered a true / or carambola in this game's nomenclature).
If both a casin and a carambola are achieved in the same shot, only the earliest of the two to occur earns points; they are not combined, though either may still combine with points scored from pins.

Fouls
The game has some  unique to its ruleset, as well as the usual fouls of billiards games. All fouls nullify any points the shooter would have earned on the foul shot, and award the opponent free points (which vary depending on the type of foul).
Knocking over pins with the shooter's own cue ball, after having hit the opponent's cue ball—this foul awards the point values of those pins to the opponent. (In player jargon this is referred to as "drinking" one's points, as they are lost like the contents of an empty glass); opponent does not receive . (Note: Knocking over pins with the red object ball on an otherwise legal shot is not a foul, and has no effect on the score (i.e., provided that the opponent's cue ball was struck first by one's own cue ball, either cue ball can be used to drive the object ball into the pins, provided that both cue balls make initial contact with each other.)
Failure to hit the opponent's cue ball at all with the shooter's own—opponent receives ball-in-hand plus 2 points.
Hitting the pins directly with the shooter's cue ball before any contact with the opponent's cue ball; opponent receives ball-in-hand plus 2 points (the erstwhile value of the knocked-over pins is not calculated at all).
Hitting the object ball directly with the shooter's cue ball before any contact with the opponent's cue ball; opponent receives ball-in-hand plus 2 points.
Knocking any ball off the table; opponent receives ball-in-hand plus 2 points (the ball is spotted in its starting position, or as close to this position as possible, unless it was the now-incoming opponent's cue ball, which as noted is in-hand).
 the cue ball entirely or partially over an interfering ball; opponent receives ball-in-hand plus 2 points.
Standard billiards-wide fouls also apply and yield ball-in-hand plus 2 points (moving balls accidentally,  the cue ball, etc.

Because of the particularity of the first-listed foul above, players watch the game carefully, and tournaments have referees.
Any points earned by the shooter on a foul shot are awarded to the opponent (except when, as noted above, pin value is not calculated). An extra 2 points go to the opponent if the object ball was correctly hit on an otherwise foul stroke (in addition to being awarded the 3 or 4 points the object ball was worth). Ball-in-hand on fouls is not entirely free; the incoming shooter after a ball-in-hand foul can only place his/her cue ball on the opposite half of the table from the other cue ball, and must shoot from the end (short part) not side of the table.

Strategy

Five-pins integrates some of the target-shooting aspects of pool, snooker, etc. (perhaps via the influence of English billiards) into carom billiards, which is otherwise oriented at scoring carom points.

Because kicks and banks are so common, players must be more skilled at these shots than they would need to be for most other cue sports.

World Championship 5 Pins National Teams
Organized by the Union Mondiale de Billard (UMB), and inaugurated in 2019, the World Championship 5 Pins National Teams is an international event. Italy won the first edition for national teams of 5 pins in Lugano (Switzerland).

World 5 Pins National Teams Champions

World Five-pins Championship

Inaugurated in 1965, the World Five-pins Championship (Campionato del Mondo "5 Birilli") is an international event, hosted to date in various places in Italy, Argentina, Switzerland and Spain. It is semi-annual; many years since its inception have not featured such a tournament. As of early 2008, there have been twenty such tournaments. There are various divisions, including youth, women, men, teams, and a one-on-one open championship.

World Open Champions
Note: In several years, events were not held.

Five-pins Pro World Cup
Organized by Italian Federation of Billiard Sport (FIBiS), the Five-pins Pro World Cup (World Cup Pro "5 Birilli"), was a semi-annual event begun in 1993, and discontinued after 1997. In only one year (1993) were both the Pro World Cup and the World Championships held. The event was a one-on-one invitational championship, without other divisions.

Pro World Cup Champions
Note: In 1995, the event was not held.

Nine-pin variant (goriziana)

A professionally competitive version known as goriziana (or nine-pins, 9-pins, nine-pin billiards, etc.) adds four additional outer pins to the "+" pattern, and has a more complicated scoring system. Goriziana itself also has multiple amateur rules variants.

In popular culture
Five-pins is a major plot point of the Italian-produced, English-language drama/romance film Bye Bye Baby, which stars Brigitte Nielsen as a professional player. The movie does not focus on five-pins, but does demonstrate many aspects of the game clearly in a few sequences.

See also
Boccette
Goriziana

Notes

References

Bibliography

External links
Federazione Italiana Biliardo Sportivo (FIBiS)— the Italian Federation of Billiard Sport; provides rules and organizes events. 
Carom Cafe— online billiards discussions
http://magazine.biliardoweb.com
http://www.raisport.rai.it/dl/RaiTV/programmi/media/ContentItem-5ee9d0b7-1671-4069-a176-f49928baa32f-raisport.html - video (select biliardo)

Carom billiards
Obstacle billiards